Gates Corner is an unincorporated community in Koochiching County, Minnesota, United States.

Notes

Unincorporated communities in Koochiching County, Minnesota
Unincorporated communities in Minnesota